Sample preparation equipment refers to equipment used for the preparation of physical specimens for subsequent microscopy or related disciplines - including failure analysis and quality control. The equipment includes the following types of machinery:

 Precision cross-sectioning saws
 Precision lapping & polishing machines
 Selected Area Preparation Systems
 Decapsulation machinery (using mechanical, chemical/ 'jet etching' acid, laser and plasma methodologies)
 Focused ion beam (FIB) systems
 Anti-reflective coating systems
 Dimpling equipment
 Sputter coating equipment 
 Carbon and metal evaporation systems

Each of these system types incorporates a wealth of accessories and consumable items which fit the particular system for a specific application.

External links
Article from MATERIALS WORLD Journal discussing the various sample preparation disciplines that allow for failure analysis of electronic materials and components
Article from ULTRA TEC Web-site discussing the backside sample preparation of a packaged electronic device that allow for (through silicon) backside analysis
Article discussing the applications of jet etch equipment

Industrial equipment